The unadorned flycatcher (Myiophobus inornatus) is a species of bird in the family Tyrannidae. It is found in Bolivia and Peru.

Description
It is olive above with rufous edging on blackish wing feathers and pale, dull yellow below.

Habitat
Its natural habitat is subtropical or tropical moist montane forests.

References

External links
 
 
 
 
 
 
 
 

unadorned flycatcher
Birds of the Peruvian Andes
Birds of the Bolivian Andes
unadorned flycatcher
Taxonomy articles created by Polbot